The 2017 Men's Asian Individual Squash Championships is the men's edition of the 2017 Asian Individual Squash Championships, which serves as the individual Asian championship for squash players. The event took place at Express Avenue Mall in Chennai from 26 to 30 April 2017. Max Lee won his first Asian Individual Championships title, defeating Saurav Ghosal in the final.

Seeds

Draw and results

Finals

Top half

Section 1

Section 2

Bottom half

Section 3

Section 4

Source:

See also
2017 Women's Asian Individual Squash Championships
Asian Individual Squash Championships

References

External links
Asian Individual Squash Championships 2015 SquashSite website

2017 in squash
Squash in Asia
International sports competitions hosted by India
Squash tournaments in India
2017 in Indian sport